Ring binders (loose leaf binders, looseleaf binders, or sometimes called files in Britain) are large folders that contain file folders or hole punched papers. These binders come in various sizes and can accommodate an array of paper sizes. These are held in the binder by circular or D-shaped retainers, onto which the contents are threaded. The rings themselves come in a variety of sizes, including , though other sizes are also available. The rings are usually spring-loaded, but can also be secured by lever arch mechanisms or other securing systems. The binders themselves are typically made from plastic with metal rings. Early designs were patented during the early 1890s to the early 1900s.

History
American Henry Tillinghast Sisson invented the three ring binder, receiving patent no. 23506 on April 5, 1859. 

German Friedrich Soennecken invented ring binders in 1886 in Bonn. He also registered a patent on November 14, 1886, for his Papierlocher für Sammelmappen ("paper hole maker for folders", or hole punch). German Louis Leitz, founder of Leitz, later made some important changes in development of ring binders in Stuttgart-Feuerbach. Leitz introduced the "finger hole" on the side of the binder to aid removal from crowded shelves, thereby creating the modern ring binder.

The four-hole version has no ISO standard.

Another design for ring binders was invented in 1889 by Andreas Tengwall in Helsingborg, Sweden, and patented in 1890 under the name 'Trio binder', named after a business consortium of Tengwall and two associates. Tengwall's design uses four rings, in two paired sets. The hole placement of Tengwall's Trio binder is still used as a de facto standard for hole punching in Sweden under the name triohålning.

William P. Pitt obtained patent no. 778070 on December 20, 1904 for a 3-ring binder that became a standard in the United States.

Variations
Binders come in many standard sizes with respect to both capacity and paper size. Most countries use a two- or four-hole system for holding A4 sheets.

The most common type in Canada and the United States is a three-ring system for letter size pages; similar to the European standard A4 type paper. "Ledger" size binders hold  paper, and may use standard 3-ring spacing or multiple additional rings.

The distance from the punched holes to the nearest edge of the paper is less critical, since small differences do not affect the compatibility of paper and binder.

More extensive coverage of official and de facto standards for punched holes can be found in the article Hole punch.

Japan uses a unique system, referred to as J-Binder. This system is compatible with A4 and B5 paper with different products. The A4 version uses 30 closely spaced rings, while the B5 one uses 26. Less common variants such as a 20 ring A5 version also exist.

Many personal organizers and memorandum books use a six- or seven-hole system, including Filofax and FranklinCovey. Most systems have the rings on the left side of the papers as one opens the binder, but there are also binders that have the rings (concealed by the binder cover) at the top edge of the paper, reminiscent of a clipboard.

There are also various options of binder types such as the commonly used vinyl binders or customizable poly binders, turned edge binders, and sewn binders.

Most binder covers are made of three pieces, in the fashion of a hardback book, with three pieces of board held together with sheets of vinyl or other materials and hinges. Materials vary widely. Some vinyl binders have a clear pocket on the outside for cover pages, and many have pockets in the inner cover for loose papers, business cards, compact discs, etc. There are also zipper binders, which zip the binder up and keep papers from falling out. Some binders are stored in matching slipcases for greater protection; either with one slipcase per each binder, or one slipcase holding several binders.

It is also possible to insert the sheet of paper into a polypropylene sheet protector. The sheet protector has pre-punched holes, so the document can be kept untouched and unwrinkled.

Gallery

See also
 Hole punch
 Punched pocket
 Loose leaf
 Notebook
 Springback binder
Card binder

References

External links

German inventions
1886 introductions
Notebooks
Office equipment
Stationery
Swedish inventions